The Heinz Foundations are several charitable foundations founded by members of the Pittsburgh-based Heinz Foods dynasty. 

The Heinz Family Philanthropies
are based in Pittsburgh and Washington, D.C., and include:
 The Teresa and H. John Heinz III Foundation 
 The H. John Heinz III Foundation 
 The Heinz Family Foundation 

The Heinz Endowments
are based in Pittsburgh and include:
 Howard Heinz Endowment
 Vira I. Heinz Endowment

External links
Heinz Family Philanthropies
Heinz Endowments
The Heinz Awards

Foundations based in the United States
Heinz family